Callopsis is a monotypic genus from the plant family Araceae and has only one species, Callopsis volkensii. This plant forms a creeping rhizome and has cordate-ovate leaves that are medium green and glaborous. The inflorescence is typical of the family Araceae, with a white spathe and yellow spadix. The spadix is shorter than the spathe and its male and female flowers are separated shortly.

There have been reports of the species in Cameroon, but these remain unconfirmed.

References

External links 
https://web.archive.org/web/20110721145428/http://www.cate-araceae.org/taxonomy/Callopsis
http://www.aroid.org/genera/generapage.php?genus=callopsis
https://web.archive.org/web/20080430045028/http://scratchpad.cate-araceae.org/taxonomy/term/754

Aroideae
Monotypic Araceae genera